John Fane, 7th Earl of Westmorland (24 March 1685 – 26 August 1762), styled The Honourable John Fane from 1691 to 1733 and Lord Catherlough from 1733 to 1736, of Mereworth Castle in Kent, was a British Army officer and politician who sat in the House of Commons in three separate stretches between 1708 and 1734.

Origins
He was the son of Vere Fane, 4th Earl of Westmorland by his wife Rachel Bence. He succeeded both his childless elder brothers, namely Vere Fane, 5th Earl of Westmorland and Thomas Fane, 6th Earl of Westmorland.

Inheritance
Since Fane outlived many of his siblings, including Vere Fane, 5th Earl of Westmorland and Thomas Fane, 6th Earl of Westmorland, and was the only heir male, he inherited most of their properties. His wealth increased further with an inheritance from his younger brother Mildmay Fane and with the revenue from his Caterlough barony.

Career
He commenced his law studies at Lincoln's Inn in 1703 and entered as a fellow commoner at Emmanuel College, Cambridge in 1703/4. It is likely that his older brother Thomas influenced his decision to become Member of Parliament for Hythe in 1708, a position which he held until 1711. That same year, he joined the army and fought at Oudenarde and Lille. After the war, he returned to England with a letter for the Lord High Treasurer, Lord Godolphin, from the Duke of Marlborough, who wrote that "Fane behaved himself very well, so that I am desirous you would do him the honour of presenting him to the Queen. I like him much better than his brother [Westmorland]." A year later, however, he left for the continent again, this time as a Captain of horse in William Cardogan's regiment, and saw action at Malplaquet.

In 1709 and 1710, he was re-elected as Member of Parliament for Hythe, but he was forced to relinquish his seat in 1711 due to a petition by Tory candidates. He later became Member of Parliament for Kent from 1715 to 1722, and for Buckingham from 1727 to 1734. While originally a Whig, Fane changed sides and became a Tory during the reign of George II. He may also have been involved in Jacobite intrigues.

During his service in the British Army, Fane reached the rank of colonel in the 1st Troop, Horse Guards, and that of general in 1761.  He was created 1st Baron Catherlough of Catherlough in Ireland on 4 October 1733 and succeeded his elder brother as 7th Earl of Westmorland in 1736. He is also notable for having commissioned Colen Campbell to build his Palladian seat at Mereworth Castle in Kent.

Marriage
In 1716 he married Mary Cavendish (1700-1778), only daughter and heiress of Lord Henry Cavendish, MP (by his wife Rhoda Cartwright, a daughter of William Cartwright, of Aynho, Northamptonshire), 2nd son of William Cavendish, 1st Duke of Devonshire. Without issue.

Death and succession
When Fane died without issue in 1762, his Irish barony became extinct; the barony of Le Despencer, being a barony in fee, devolved upon his nephew Sir Francis Dashwood, Bt; and the earldom of Westmorland went to the heir male, Thomas Fane of Bristol, a merchant, son of Henry Fane (d. 1726,) attorney-at-law, grandson of Sir Francis Fane,  and great-grandson of Sir Francis Fane, of Fulbeck, Lincolnshire,  the third son of Francis Fane, 1st Earl of Westmorland.

References

Literature

1685 births
1762 deaths
17th-century English nobility
18th-century English nobility
37th Regiment of Foot officers
British Life Guards officers
Fane, John
Fane, John
Fane, John
Chancellors of the University of Oxford
John
Fane, John
Royal Horse Guards officers
Earls of Westmorland
British military personnel of the War of the Spanish Succession
British Army generals
Peers of Ireland created by George II
Barons le Despencer
Barons Burghersh